Anosovsky is a rural locality (a settlement) in Anosovsky Selsoviet of Tyndinsky District, Amur Oblast, Russia. The population was 200 as of 2018. There are 2 streets.

Geography 
Anosovsky is located 92 km southwest of Tynda (the district's administrative centre) by road. Purikan is the nearest rural locality.

References 

Rural localities in Tyndinsky District